The 2017 Los Angeles Angels season was the 57th season of the Angels franchise and the 52nd in Anaheim (all of them at Angel Stadium). The Angels began the season on April 3 against the Oakland Athletics and finished the season on October 1 against the Seattle Mariners. They improved upon their record from last season, but still failed to make the playoffs for the third consecutive season, finishing 5 games behind the Minnesota Twins for the second wild card spot.

Offseason and spring training
In the first trade of the MLB offseason on November 3, 2016, the Angels acquired Cameron Maybin for Minor League pitcher Victor Alcantara. Jesse Chavez signed with the team on November 12. On December 10, the Angels traded Minor League pitchers Austin Adams and Kyle McGowin to the Washington Nationals for infielder Danny Espinosa. The Milwaukee Brewers sent catcher Martin Maldonado to the Angels for Jett Bandy on December 13. The Angels then signed Ben Revere, an outfielder, on December 23. The Angels' first signing of 2017 was infielder Luis Valbuena, formerly of the Houston Astros, who signed a 2-year, $15 million deal on January 24. On February 4, first baseman Dustin Ackley was signed to a minor league contract with an offer to attend spring training. Pitcher Yusmeiro Petit also inked a minor league deal with a spring training invitation days later; he went on to make the Opening Day roster.

The Angels ended spring training with a 21–14 win–loss record, excluding a tie game that did not count toward the standings. Their .600 winning percentage was the best in the Cactus League.

Regular season

Season standings

American League West

American League Leaders

Record against opponents

Game log

|-style="background:#fbb
| 1 || April 3 || @ A's || 2–4 || Graveman (1–0) || Nolasco (0–1) || Casilla (1) || 36,067 || 0–1 || L1
|-style="background:#cfc
| 2 || April 4 || @ A's || 7–6 || Bailey (1–0) || Dull (0–1) || Bedrosian (1) || 11,225 || 1–1 || W1
|-style="background:#cfc
| 3 || April 5 || @ A's || 5–0 || Ramirez (1–0) || Cotton (0–1) ||—
| 13,405 || 2–1 || W2
|-style="background:#fbb
| 4 || April 6 || @ A's || 1–5 || Triggs (1–0) || Skaggs (0–1) ||—
| 13,292 || 2–2 || L1
|-style="background:#cfc
| 5 || April 7 || Mariners || 5–1 || Chavez (1–0) || Gallardo (0–1) ||—
| 43,911 || 3–2 || W1
|-style="background:#cfc
| 6 ||April 8|| Mariners || 5–4 || Ramírez (2–0) || Scribner (0–1) || Bedrosian (2) || 42,668 || 4–2 ||W2
|-style="background:#cfc
| 7 ||April 9|| Mariners || 10–9 || Bailey (2–0) || Díaz (0–1)||—
| 37,175|| 5–2 ||W3
|-style="background:#cfc
| 8 ||April 11
| Rangers || 6–5 (10) || Bedrosian  (1–0) || Jeffress (0–1) ||—
| 34,044 || 6–2 ||W4
|-style="background:#fbb
| 9 ||April 12
| Rangers || 3–8 || Griffin (1–0) || Chavez (1–1) || Leclerc (1) || 34,599 || 6–3 || L1
|-style="background:#fbb
| 10 ||April 13
| Rangers || 3–8 || Darvish (1–1) || Nolasco (0–2) ||—
| 30,255 || 6–4 || L2
|-style="background:#fbb
| 11 ||April 14
| @ Royals || 1–7 || Duffy (2–0) || Ramírez (2–1) ||—
| 26,838 || 6–5 || L3
|-style="background:#fbb
| 12 ||April 15
| @ Royals || 2–3 || Soria (1–0) || Alvarez (1–0) ||—
| 24,162 || 6–6 || L4
|-style="background:#fbb
| 13 ||April 16
| @ Royals || 0–1 || Herrera (1–0) || Parker (0–1) ||—
| 27,950 || 6–7 || L5
|-style="background:#fbb
| 14 ||April 17
| @ Astros || 0–3 || Morton (1–1) || Chavez (1–2) || Giles (3) || 23,501 || 6–8 ||L6
|-style="background:#cfc
| 15 ||April 18
| @ Astros || 5–2 || Nolasco (1–2) || Musgrove (1–1) || Bedrosian (3) || 21,760 || 7–8 ||W1
|-style="background:#fbb
| 16 ||April 19
| @ Astros || 1–5 || Keuchel (3–0) || Ramírez (2–2) ||—
| 24,028 || 7–9 || L1
|-style="background:#fbb
| 17 ||April 20
| @ Astros || 1–2 || McCullers (2–0) || Shoemaker (0–1) || Devenski (1) || 23,173 || 7–10 || L2
|-style="background:#fbb
| 18 ||April 21
| Blue Jays || 7–8 (13) || Tepera (1–0) || Chavez (1–3) || Biagini (1) || 40,176 || 7–11 || L3
|-style="background:#cfc
| 19 ||April 22
| Blue Jays || 5–4 || Skaggs (1–1) || Lawrence (0–2) || Norris (1) || 41,345 || 8–11 || W1
|-style="background:#fbb
| 20 ||April 23
| Blue Jays || 2–6 || Stroman (2–2) || Guerra (0–1) ||—
| 35,034 || 8–12 || L1
|-style="background:#cfc
| 21 ||April 24
| Blue Jays || 2–1 || Chavez (2–3) || Liriano (1–2) || Norris (2) || 25,304 || 9–12 || W1
|-style="background:#cfc
| 22 ||April 25
| A's || 2–1 (11) ||  Pounders (1–0) || Madson (0–2) ||—
| 30,124 || 10–12 || W2
|-style="background:#cfc
| 23 ||April 26
| A's || 8–5 || Shoemaker (1–1) || Manaea (1–2) || Norris (3) || 30,248 || 11–12 || W3
|-style="background:#cfc
| 24 ||April 27
| A's || 2–1 || Nolasco (2–2) || Graveman (2–1) || Norris (4) || 37,603|| 12–12 || W4
|-style="background:#cfc
| 25 ||April 28
| @ Rangers || 6–3 || Guerra (1–1) || Jeffress (0–2) || Alvarez (1) || 28,968|| 13–12 || W5
|-style="background:#fbb
| 26 ||April 29
| @ Rangers || 3–6 || Darvish (3–2) || Chavez (2–4) || — || 44,597|| 13–13 || L1
|-style="background:#cfc
| 27 ||April 30
| @ Rangers || 5–2 || Ramírez (3–2) || Perez (1–4) || Norris (5) || 38,804 || 14–13 || W1
|-

|-style=background:#cfc
| 28 ||May 2|| @ Mariners || 6–4 (11) || Guerra (2–1) || Pazos (0–1) || — || 15,080 || 15–13 || W2
|-style=background:#fbb
| 29 ||May 3
| @ Mariners || 7–8 || Machi (1–0) || Parker (0–2) || Díaz (5) || 13,799 || 15–14 || L1
|-style=background:#fbb
| 30 ||May 4
| @ Mariners || 1–3 || Miranda (3–2) || Meyer (0–1) || — || 15,915|| 15–15 || L2
|-style=background:#fbb
| 31 ||May 5
| Astros || 6–7 (10) || Giles (1–1) || Norris (0–1) || Devenski (2) || 34,556 || 15–16 || L3
|-style=background:#cfc
| 32 ||May 6
| Astros || 2–1 || Norris (1–1) || Devenski (2–2) ||—
| 41,097 || 16–16 || W1
|-style=background:#fbb
| 33 ||May 7
| Astros || 3–5 || Fiers (1–1) || Shoemaker (1–2) || Giles (8) || 38,383 || 16–17 || L1
|-style=background:#fbb
| 34 ||May 8
| @ A's || 2–3 || Hendriks (1–0) || Guerra (2–2) ||—
| 10,292 || 16–18 || L2
|-style=background:#cfc
| 35 ||May 9
| @ A's || 7–3 || Meyer (1–1) || Cotton (3–4) || Norris (6) || 11,383 || 17–18 || W1
|-style=background:#fbb
| 36 ||May 10
| @ A's || 1–3 || Triggs (5–2) || Chavez (2–5) || Casilla (6) || 11,061 || 17–19 || L1
|-style=background:#fbb
| 37 ||May 11
| Tigers || 1–7 || Fulmer (4–1) || Ramírez (3–3) || — || 30,207 || 17–20 || L2
|-style=background:#cfc
| 38 ||May 12
| Tigers ||7–0|| Shoemaker (2–2) || Zimmermann (3–2) || — || 44,311 || 18–20 || W1
|-style=background:#fbb
| 39 ||May 13
| Tigers || 3–4 || A. Wilson (0–1) || Norris (2–1) || J. Wilson (2) || 40,251 
| 18–21 || L1
|-style=background:#cfc
| 40 ||May 14
| Tigers || 4–1 || Meyer (2–1) || Verlander (3–2) || Norris (7) || 36,215 || 19–21 || W1
|-style=background:#cfc
| 41 ||May 15
| White Sox || 5–3 || Chavez (3–5) || Pelfrey (0–4) || Norris (8) || 29,445 || 20–21 || W2
|-style=background:#cfc
| 42 ||May 16
| White Sox || 7–6 (11) || Petit (1–0) || Robertson (2–1) || — || 36,089 || 21–21 || W3
|-style=background:#cfc
| 43 ||May 17
| White Sox || 12–8 || Shoemaker (3–2) || González (3–4) || — || 33,234 || 22–21 || W4
|-style=background:#fcc
| 44 ||May 19
| @ Mets || 0–3 || deGrom (3–1) || Nolasco (2–3) || Reed (5) || 36,542 || 22–22 || L1
|-style=background:#fcc
| 45 ||May 20
| @ Mets || 5–7 || Wheeler (3–2) || Meyer (2–2) || Reed (6) || 37,264 || 22–23 || L2
|-style=background:#cfc
| 46 ||May 21
| @ Mets || 12–5 || Chavez (4–5) || Milone (1–2) || — || 39,501 || 23–23 || W1
|-style=background:#cfc
| 47 ||May 22
| @ Rays || 3–2 || Ramírez (4–3) || Díaz (0–3) || Norris (9) || 12,249 || 24–23 || W2
|-style=background:#cfc
| 48 ||May 23
| @ Rays || 4–0 || Shoemaker (4–2) || Cobb (4–4) || — || 9,014 || 25–23 || W3
|-style=background:#fbb
| 49 ||May 24
| @ Rays || 2–5 || Ramirez (3–0) || Nolasco (2–4) || Colomé (12) || 9,975 || 25–24 || L1
|-style=background:#fbb
| 50 ||May 25
| @ Rays || 0–4 || Andriese (5–1) || Wright (0–1) ||— || 9,459 || 25–25 || L2
|-style=background:#fbb
| 51 ||May 26
| @ Marlins || 5–8 || Straily (3–3) || Chavez (4–6) || Ramos (5) || 18,346 || 25–26 || L3
|-style=background:#cfc
| 52 ||May 27
| @ Marlins || 5–2 || Ramirez (5–3) || Worley (0–2) ||— || 19,366 || 26–26 || W1
|-style=background:#fbb
| 53 ||May 28
| @ Marlins || 2–9 || Urena (3–2) || Shoemaker (4–3) ||— || 20,444 || 26–27 || L1
|-style=background:#fbb
| 54 ||May 29
| Braves || 3–6 || Teherán (4–4) || Nolasco (2–5) || Johnson (11) || 37,891 || 26–28 || L2
|-style=background:#cfc
| 55 ||May 30
| Braves || 9–3 || Bridwell (1–0) || Colón (2–6) || — || 32,028 || 27–28 || W1
|-style=background:#cfc
| 56 ||May 31
| Braves || 2–1 || Parker (1–2) || Vizcaíno (2–2) || Norris (10) || 35,795 || 28–28 || W2
|-

|-style=background:#fbb
| 57 ||June 1|| Twins ||2–4 ||Rogers (3–1) ||Alvarez (0–2) ||Kintzler (14)||33,426||28–29||L1
|-style=background:#fbb
| 58 ||June 2
| Twins ||5–11 ||Gibson (2–4) ||Ramirez (5–4) ||—||39,042||28–30||L2
|-style=background:#cfc
| 59 ||June 3
| Twins ||7–2 ||Shoemaker (5–3) ||Santana (7–3) ||—||40,236||29–30||W1
|-style=background:#fbb
| 60 ||June 4
| Twins ||2-3||Berríos (4–1) ||Nolasco (2–6) ||Kintzler (15)||39,701||29–31||L1
|-style=background:#cfc
| 61 ||June 6
| @ Tigers ||5–3 ||Chavez (5–6) ||Norris (2–4) ||Norris (11)||24,175||30–31||W1
|-style=background:#fbb
| 62||June 7
| @ Tigers ||0–4 ||Farmer (2–0) ||Meyer (2–3) ||—||24,958||30–32||L1
|-style=background:#cfc
| 63 ||June 8
| @ Tigers ||11–4 ||Ramirez (6–4) ||Fulmer (6–4) ||—||34,810||31–32||W1
|-style=background:#cfc
| 64 ||June 9
| @ Astros || 9–4 || Shoemaker (6–3) || Peacock (3–1) ||—
| 40,786 || 32–32 || W2
|- style=background:#fbb
| 65 ||June 10
| @ Astros || 1–3 || Fiers (4–2) || Nolasco (2–7) || Giles (16) 
| 41,296|| 32–33 ||L1
|- style=background:#cfc
| 66 ||June 11
| @ Astros || 12–6 || Middleton (1–0) || Feliz (2–1) || — 
| 32,425|| 33–33 || W1
|- style=background:#fbb
| 67 ||June 12
| Yankees || 3–5 || Clippard (1–3) || Álvarez (0–3) || Betances (6)
| 36,245 || 33–34 || L1
|- style=background:#cfc
| 68 ||June 13
| Yankees || 3–2 (11) || Middleton (2–0) || Shreve (1–1) || —
| 33,159 || 34–34 || W1
|- style=background:#cfc
| 69 ||June 14
| Yankees || 7–5 || Parker (2–2) || Herrera (0–1) || Hernandez (1) 
| 43,851 || 35–34 || W2
|- style=background:#fbb
| 70 ||June 15
| Royals || 2–7 || Strahm (2–3) || Nolasco (2–8) ||—
| 34,884 || 35–35 || L1
|- style=background:#fbb
| 71 ||June 16
| Royals || 1–3 || Kennedy (1–6) || Chavez (5–7) || Herrera (14) 
| 34,184 || 35–36 || L2
|- style=background:#cfc
| 72 ||June 17
| Royals || 9–0 || Meyer (3–3) || Junis (2–1) ||—
| 41,209 || 36–36 || W1
|- style=background:#fbb
| 73 ||June 18
| Royals || 3–7 || Vargas (10–3) || Ramirez (6–5) ||—
| 40,178 || 36–37 || L1
|- style=background:#cfc
| 74 ||June 20
| @ Yankees || 8–3 || Parker (3–2) || Clippard (1–4) || —
| 39,853 || 37–37 || W1
|- style=background:#fbb
| 75 ||June 21
| @ Yankees ||4–8 ||Montgomery (5–4) ||Nolasco (2–9) ||—
|39,911 ||37–38 ||L1
|- style=background:#cfc
|76  ||June 22
| @ Yankees ||10–5 ||Petit (2–0) || Severino (5–3) ||—
|43,051 ||38–38 ||W1
|- style=background:#fbb
| 77 ||June 23
| @ Red Sox || 4–9 ||Porcello (4–9) ||Meyer (3–4) ||—
|37,034 || 38–39 || L1
|- style=background:#cfc
| 78 ||June 24
| @ Red Sox || 6–3 ||Ramirez (7–5) ||Price (2–2) ||Parker (1)
|36,868 || 39–39 || W1
|- style=background:#cfc
| 79 ||June 25
| @ Red Sox || 4–2 ||Bridwell (2–0) ||Fister (0–1) ||Petit (1)
|36,474 || 40–39 ||W2
|- style=background:#cfc
| 80 ||June 26
| @ Dodgers ||4–0 || Nolasco (3–9)  || Hill (4–4) || —
| 43,126 || 41–39 ||W3
|- style=background:#fbb
| 81 ||June 27
| @ Dodgers || 0–4 || Maeda (6–3)  || Chavez (5–8)  || — 
| 47,245 || 41–40 ||L1
|- style=background:#cfc
| 82 ||June 28
| Dodgers || 3–2 || Bedrosian (2–0) || Báez (2–1) || — 
| 44,669 || 42–40 || W1
|- style=background:#fbb
| 83 ||June 29
| Dodgers || 2–6 || Kershaw (12–2) || Ramírez (7–6) || Jansen (18)
| 44,807 || 42–41 || L1
|- style=background:#fbb
| 84 ||June 30
| Mariners  || 0–10 || Miranda (7–4) || Bridwell (2–1) ||—
| 40,059 ||42–42 || L2
|-

|- style=background:#cfc
|85||July 1|| Mariners || 4–0 || Nolasco (4–9) || Gaviglio (3–3) ||—
| 44,644 || 43–42 || W1
|- style=background:#fbb
|86||July 2
| Mariners || 3–5 || Paxton (5–3) || Chavez (5–9) || Díaz (13)
| 39,279 || 43–43 || L1
|- style=background:#fbb
|87||July 3
| @ Twins || 2–6 || Mejía (4–3) || Meyer (3–5) || — 
| 36,182 || 43–44 || L2
|- style=background:#fbb
|88||July 4
| @ Twins || 4–5 || Gibson (5–6) || Ramirez (7–7) ||Kintzler (22)
| 25,013 || 43–45 || L3
|- style=background:#cfc
|89||July 5
| @ Twins || 2–1 || Bridwell (3–1) || Santana (10–6) || Norris (12) 
| 19,106 || 44–45 || W1  
|- style=background:#fbb
|90||July 7
| @ Rangers || 0–10 || Hamels (4–0) || Nolasco (4–10) || — 
| 40,276 || 44–46 || L1
|- style=background:#fbb
|91||July 8
| @ Rangers || 2–5 || Ross (2–1) || Chavez (5–10) || — 
| 36,817 || 44–47 || L2
|- style=background:#cfc
|92||July 9
| @ Rangers || 3–0 || Ramirez (8–7) || Darvish (6–8) || Norris (13) 
| 28,384 || 45–47 || W1
|-style="text-align:center; background:#bbcaff;"
|colspan="10"|88th All-Star Game in Miami, Florida
|- style=background:#fbb
|93||July 14
| Rays || 1–2 (10) || Boxberger (2–1) || Bedrosian (2–1) || Colomé (26)
| 38,119 || 45–48 || L1
|- style=background:#fbb
|94||July 15
| Rays || 3–6 || Cobb (8–6) || Ramírez (8–8) || — 
| 38,515 || 45–49 || L2
|- style=background:#cfc
|95||July 16
| Rays || 4–3 || Hernandez (1–0) || Diaz (1–4) || Norris (14)
| 36,178 || 46–49 || W1
|- style=background:#fbb
|96||July 18
| Nationals || 3–4 || Jackson (1–0) || Bedrosian (2–2) || Doolittle (4)
| 43,345 || 46–50 || L1
|- style=background:#cfc
|97||July 19
| Nationals || 7–0 || Meyer (4–5) || Gonzalez (8–5) || — 
| 41,065 || 47–50 || W1
|- style=background:#fbb
|98||July 21
| Red Sox || 2–6 || Sale (12–4) || Nolasco (4–11) || – 
| 37,714 || 47–51 || L1
|- style=background:#cfc
|99||July 22
| Red Sox || 7–3 || Ramirez (9–8) || Price (5–3) || —
| 43,829 || 48–51 || W1
|- style=background:#cfc
|100||July 23
| Red Sox || 3–2 || Bridwell (4–1) || Porcello (4–13) || Norris (15)
| 40,471 || 49–51 || W2
|- style=background:#fbb
|101||July 25
| @ Indians || 7–11 (11) || Otero (2–0) || Norris (1–3) || — 
| 22,364 || 49–52 || L1
|- style=background:#fbb
|102||July 26
| @ Indians || 4–10 || Shaw (4–4) || Nolasco (4–12) || — 
| 22,658 || 49–53 || L2
|- style=background:#fbb
|103||July 27
| @ Indians || 1–2 || Bauer (9–8) || Ramírez (9–9) || Allen (18) 
| 28,083 || 49–54 || L3
|- style=background:#cfc
|104||July 28
| @ Blue Jays || 7–2 || Bridwell (5–1) || Happ (3–8) ||—
| 39,828 || 50–54 || W1
|- style=background:#cfc
|105||July 29
| @ Blue Jays || 6–5 || Scribner (1–0) || Osuna (3–1) || Norris (16) 
| 46,502 || 51–54 || W2
|- style=background:#fbb
|106||July 30
| @ Blue Jays || 10–11 || Dermody (1–0) || Norris (1–4) || — 
| 46,852 || 51–55 || L1
|-

|- style=background:#cfc
|107|| August 1 || Phillies || 7–1 || Nolasco (5–12) || Nola (8–7) || — 
| 36,344 || 52–55 || W1
|- style=background:#cfc
|108|| August 2 || Phillies || 7–0 || Ramirez (10–9) || Thompson (1–1) ||—
| 34,623 || 53–55 || W2
|- style=background:#cfc
|109|| August 3 || Phillies || 5–4 || Petit (3–0) || García (1–2) || Norris (17)
| 34,710 || 54–55 || W3
|- style=background:#cfc
|110|| August 4 || A's || 8–6 || Chavez (6–10) || Coulombe (2–2) || Norris (18)
| 43,330 || 55–55 || W4
|- style=background:#fbb
|111|| August 5 || A's || 0–5 || Blackburn (3–1) || Skaggs (1–2) ||—
| 39,180 || 55–56 || L1
|- style=background:#fbb
|112|| August 6 || A's || 10–11 || Smith (2–0) || Norris (1–5) || Treinen (5) 
| 38,278 || 55–57 || L2
|- style=background:#fbb
|113|| August 7 || Orioles || 2–6 || Bundy (11–8) || Ramirez (10–10) || — 
| 34,142 || 55–58 || L3
|- style=background:#cfc
|114|| August 8 || Orioles || 3–2 || Bridwell (6–1) || Hellickson (7–6) || Middleton (1)
| 35,723 || 56–58 || W1
|- style=background:#cfc
|115|| August 9 || Orioles || 5–1 || Scribner (2–0) || Gausman (8–8) || — 
| 36,202 || 57–58 || W2
|- style=background:#cfc
|116|| August 10 || @ Mariners || 6–3 || Norris (2–5) || Diaz (2–5) || Bedrosian (4)
| 35,021 || 58–58 || W3
|- style=background:#cfc
|117|| August 11 || @ Mariners || 6–5 || Middleton (3–0) || Pazos (3–4) || Petit (2)
| 38,206 || 59–58 || W4
|- style=background:#cfc
|118|| August 12 || @ Mariners || 6–3 || Middleton (4–0) || Zych (5–3) || Bedrosian (5)
| 45,388 || 60–58 || W5
|- style=background:#cfc
|119|| August 13 || @ Mariners || 4–2 || Bridwell (7–1) || Miranda (7–6) || Middleton (2)
| 43,199 || 61–58 || W6
|- style=background:#fbb
|120|| August 15 || @ Nationals || 1–3 || González (11–5) || Skaggs (1–3) || Doolittle (12)  || 32,355 || 61–59 || L1
|- style=background:#cfc
|121|| August 16 || @ Nationals || 3–2 || Nolasco (6–12) || Roark (9–8) || Bedrosian (6) || 30,307 || 62–59 || W1
|- style=background:#fbb
|122|| August 18 || @ Orioles || 7–9 || O'Day (1–3) || Middleton (4–1) || — 
| 26,185 || 62–60 || L1
|- style=background:#cfc
|123|| August 19 || @ Orioles || 5–1 || Ramirez (11–10) || Gausman (9–9) ||—
| 43,929 || 63–60 || W1
|- style=background:#cfc
|124|| August 20 || @ Orioles || 5–4 || Bedrosian (3–2) || Brach (3–3) || Norris (19) 
| 24,715 || 64–60 || W2
|- style=background:#fbb
|125|| August 21 || Rangers || 3–5 || Hamels (9–1) || Skaggs (1–4) || Claudio (7)
| 35,204 || 64–61 || L1
|- style=background:#cfc
|126|| August 22 || Rangers || 10–1 || Middleton (5–1) || Ross (3–3) || — 
| 37,033 || 65–61 || W1
|- style=background:#fbb
|127|| August 23 || Rangers || 5–7 || Claudio (3–1) || Paredes (0–1) || Barnette (1)
| 35,497 || 65–62 || L1
|- style=background:#fbb
|128|| August 24 || Rangers || 0–3 || Pérez (9–10) || Scribner (2–1) || Rodriguez (1) 
| 34,032 || 65–63 || L2
|- style=background:#fbb
|129|| August 25 || Astros || 1–2 || McHugh (2–2) || Bridwell (7–2) || Giles (25) 
| 42,333 || 65–64 || L3
|- style=background:#cfc
|130|| August 26 || Astros || 7–6 || Wood (2–4) || Clippard (2–8) || Parker (2)
| 41,101 || 66–64 || W1
|- style=background:#fbb
|131|| August 27 ||Astros  || 5–7 || Musgrove (6–8) || Bedrosian (3–3) || Giles (26) 
| 37,606 || 66–65 || L1
|- style=background:#cfc
|132|| August 28 || A's || 3–1 || Heaney (1–0) || Gossett (3–7) || Parker (3)
| 33,719 || 67–65 || W1
|- style=background:#cfc
|133|| August 29 || A's || 8–2 || Chavez (7–10) || Smith (0–4) || — 
| 36,229|| 68–65 || W2
|- style=background:#cfc
|134|| August 30 || A's || 10–8 || Bedrosian (4–3) || Hatcher (0–2) || Parker (4)
| 36,022 || 69–65 || W3
|-

|- style=background:#fbb
|135||September 1|| @ Rangers || 9–10 || Claudio (4–1) || Bedrosian (4–4) ||—
| 32,240 || 69–66 || L1
|- style=background:#cfc
|136||September 2|| @ Rangers || 7–4 (10) || Petit (4–0) || Leclerc (2–3) || Parker (5) 
| 25,138 || 70–66 || W1
|- style=background:#fbb
|137||September 3|| @ Rangers || 6–7 || Perez (11–10) || Heaney (1–1) || Barnette (2)
| 28,783 || 70–67 || L1
|- style=background:#cfc
|138||September 4|| @ A's || 11–9 (11) || Salas (1–0) || Treinen (1–5) || Middleton (3)
| 14,571 || 71–67 || W1
|- style=background:#cfc
|139||September 5|| @ A's ||  8–7 (10) || Bedrosian (5–4) || Treinen (1–6) || Paredes (1)
| 11,110 || 72–67 || W2
|- style=background:#fbb
|140||September 6|| @ A's || 1–3 || Manaea (10–9) || Skaggs (1–5) || Hatcher (1)
| 10,544 || 72–68 || L1
|- style=background:#fbb
|141||September 8|| @ Mariners || 3–4 || Leake (9–12) || Nolasco (6–13) || Díaz (32) 
| 21,396 || 72–69 || L2
|- style=background:#fbb
|142||September 9|| @ Mariners || 1–8 || Albers (4–1) || Heaney (1–2) || — 
| 26,248 || 72–70 || L3
|- style=background:#cfc
|143||September 10|| @ Mariners || 5–3 || Bedrosian (6–4) || Vincent (3–2) || Petit (3)
| 20,094 || 73–70 || W1
|- style=background:#fbb
|144||September 12|| Astros || 0–1 || Verlander (12–8) || Richards (0–1) || Giles (30) 
| 36,088 || 73–71 || L1
|- style=background:#cfc
|145||September 13|| Astros || 9–1 || Skaggs (2–5) || Fiers (8–10) || — 
| 33,899 || 74–71 || W1
|- style=background:#fbb
|146||September 14|| Astros || 2–5 || Peacock (11–2) || Nolasco (6–14) || — 
| 35,715 || 74–72 || L1
|- style=background:#cfc
|147||September 15|| Rangers || 7–6 || Petit (5–0) || Mendez (0–1) || Parker (6) 
| 41,409 || 75–72 || W1
|- style=background:#cfc
|148||September 16|| Rangers || 2–0 || Bridwell (8–2) || Hamels (10–4) || Petit (4) 
| 40,719 || 76–72 || W2
|- style=background:#fbb
|149||September 17|| Rangers || 2–4 || González (8–11) || Richards (0–2) || Diekman (1) 
| 36,709 || 76–73 || L1
|- style=background:#fbb
|150||September 19|| Indians || 3–6 || Clevinger (11–5) || Skaggs (2–6) ||—
| 36,171 || 76–74 || L2
|- style=background:#fbb
|151||September 20|| Indians || 5–6 || Olson (1–0) || Petit (5–1) || Shaw (3) 
| 38,424 || 76–75 || L3
|- style=background:#fbb
|152||September 21|| Indians || 1–4 || McAllister (2–2) || Bridwell (8–3) || Olson (1)
| 29,863 || 76–76 || L4
|- style=background:#fbb
|153||September 22|| @ Astros || 0–3 || Verlander (14–8) || Petit (5–2) || Giles (33) |
| 34,127|| 76–77 || L5
|- style=background:#fbb
|154||September 23|| @ Astros || 2–6 || Morton (13–7) || Norris (2–6) ||—
| 34,035 || 76–78 || L6
|- style=background:#cfc
|155||September 24|| @ Astros || 7–5 || Middleton (6–1) || Devenski (8–5) || 'Parker (7) 
| 36,756 || 77–78 || W1
|- style=background:#fbb
|156||September 25|| @ White Sox || 2–4 || Shields (5–7) || Nolasco (6–15) || Minaya (7) 
| 13,443 || 77–79 || L1
|- style=background:#cfc
|157||September 26|| @ White Sox || 9–3 || Bridwell (9–3) || Volstad (1–1) || — 
| 13,786 || 78–79 || W1
|- style=background:#fbb
|158||September 27|| @ White Sox || 4–6 (10) || Farquhar (4–2) || Parker (3–3) || — 
| 17,012 || 78–80 || L1
|- style=background:#fbb
|159||September 28|| @ White Sox || 4–5 || Infante (2–1) || Chavez (7–11) || Minaya (8)
| 19,596 || 78–81 || L2
|- style=background:#cfc
|160||September 29|| Mariners || 6–5 || Wood (3–4) || Rzepczynski (2–2) || Parker (8)
| 35,106 || 79–81 || W1
|- style=background:#fbb
|161||September 30|| Mariners || 4–6 || Lawrence (2–3) || Bedrosian (6–5) || Díaz (34) 
| 38,075 || 79–82 || L1
|- style=background:#cfc
|162|| October 1 || Mariners || 6–2 || Bridwell' (10–3) || Simmons (0–2) ||—
| 34,940 || 80–82 || W1
|-

|- style="text-align:center;"
| Legend:       = Win       = Loss       = PostponementBold = Angels team member

Roster

Farm system

All coaches and rosters can be found on each team's website.

References

External links
Los Angeles Angels Official Site
2017 Los Angeles Angels season at Baseball Reference''

Los Angeles Angels
Los Angeles Angels
Los Angeles Angels seasons